Chris Naggar (born December 9, 1997) is an American football placekicker who is a free agent.

Early life and education
Naggar was born on December 9, 1997, in Arlington, Texas. He attended Arlington High School before playing college football at Texas. He was named district special teams MVP as a senior in high school. Naggar redshirted his first year at Texas, and did not play in his second. As a junior in 2019, he played seven games at the punter position, making 25 punts for 983 yards with a long of 67 yards, 10 inside the 20 and three of 50+. He changed to kicker in 2020, when he transferred to SMU. As a senior, he was 17-for-21 on field goals, leading his conference in accuracy.

Professional career

New York Jets
After going unselected in the 2021 NFL Draft, Naggar signed a contract as an undrafted free agent with the New York Jets. He was waived on August 16, 2021.

Cleveland Browns
Naggar was signed to the Cleveland Browns practice squad on September 2, 2021, to compete with Chase McLaughlin. He was promoted to the active roster prior to their week one game against the Kansas City Chiefs, following an injury to McLaughlin. He did not appear on any snaps during the game and was reverted back to the practice squad the following day. Naggar was elevated to the active roster again on December 24, 2021 as a COVID-19 replacement player after McLaughlin was placed on the COVID list. Naggar made his NFL debut on Christmas Day for Cleveland's week 16 loss against the Green Bay Packers. In the game, Naggar converted a 37-yard field goal and made 1 out of 2 extra point attempts. Naggar was released from the Browns' practice squad on December 30, 2021.

Dallas Cowboys
On February 3, 2022, the Dallas Cowboys signed Naggar to a reserve/future contract. On May 13, 2022, he was released by the Cowboys.

Pittsburgh Steelers
In January of 2023, he attended a work-out hosted by the Pittsburgh Steelers along with three other kickers and punters.

References

External links

1997 births
Living people
Players of American football from Texas
American football placekickers
Texas Longhorns football players
SMU Mustangs football players
New York Jets players
Cleveland Browns players
Dallas Cowboys players